Billbergia macrolepis is a species of flowering plant in the genus Billbergia. This species is native to Costa Rica, Panama, Colombia, Ecuador, Venezuela, and Guyana.

Cultivars
 Billbergia 'Anubis'

References

macrolepis
Flora of Costa Rica
Flora of Panama
Flora of South America
Plants described in 1936